Mashkay (Urdu:  ماشکئی) is a tehsil of Awaran District in the Balochistan province of Pakistan. It is administratively subdivided into three Union Councils, these are:

 Gajjar
  Nokjo
 Parwar

Demography
Mashkay is the largest tehsil of the district Awaran. Consist of three union council. In Mashkay four high school for boys and one high school for girls.  The population is about 100,000. 100% of the people are Muslim. Balochi is the main language.

The main tribes are:

 Muhammad Hassani
 Sajidi
 Siapad
 Mirwani
 Rind
 Shahwani
 Gazozai
 sumalani

The main villages are:
 Gajar
 Jebree 
 Parwar
 Nokjo
 Mangoli
 Mianikalat
 Liaquatabad

Jebree village
This village is one of the famous villages of  Awaran District. Mohd Hasni is the main tribe of this area. Another important tribe is Sajidi, Rind which is a limited one because shifted from Makuran which is well known due to its hospitality in Mashkay.

References

Populated places in Awaran District
Tehsils of Balochistan, Pakistan